Vacaville is a city located in Solano County, California, within the North Bay subregion of the San Francisco Bay Area. The city was founded in 1851 and is named after Juan Manuel Vaca.

As of the 2020 census, Vacaville had a population of 102,386, making it the third-largest city in Solano County. Other nearby cities include Fairfield, Suisun City, Dixon, Rio Vista, Vallejo, Benicia, and Napa.

History

Prior to European contact, the indigenous Patwin tribe lived in the area with the Ululato tribelet establishing a chiefdom around the Ululato village in what is now downtown Vacaville along the Ulatis Creek.

The early settler pioneers of the land were Juan Manuel Cabeza Vaca and Juan Felipe Peña, who were awarded a  Mexican land grant in 1842. The same year, Vaca and Peña's families settled in the area of Lagoon Valley. Peña's Adobe home is the oldest standing building, built in 1842.

Discussions for the sale of a portion of land to William McDaniel began in August 1850. A written agreement was signed on December 13, 1851, forming a township, nine square miles of land were deeded to William McDaniel for $3,000, and the original city plans were laid out from that. In the agreement, McDaniel's would name the new town after Juan Manuel Cabeza Vaca.

In 1880, Leonard Buck created the California Fruit Shipping Association, and the L.W. and F.H. Buck Company, an early company auctioning fruit in the state, and Vacaville was soon home to many large produce companies and local farms, which flourished due to the Vaca Valley's rich soil.

It officially became a city in 1892.

In 1885, the first grade school built was Ulatis School. In 1898, the town's first high school was built, Vacaville Union High School.

In 1968, the Vacaville Heritage Council was established.

On August 29, 2022, a truck transporting tomatoes crashed on Interstate 80 in Vacaville, injuring four, splattering over 150,000 of the tomatoes onto the eastbound section of the freeway, and significantly delaying eastbound traffic for hours. The peculiarity of the freeway accident subsequently resulted in international news coverage.

Geography

Vacaville is surrounded by the Vaca Mountains to the south and to the west and the Sacramento Valley to the north and to the east.

A number of rare and endangered species occur in the Vacaville area. Endangered plants, which have historically occurred in the vernal pool areas in and around Vacaville include Legenre limosa, Plagiobothrys hystriculus, Downingia humilis, Contra Costa goldfields (Lasthenia conjugens), and showy Indian clover (Trifolium amoenum).  To this day Trifolium amoenum can still be found in Lagoon Valley Regional Park.

Excluding the Putah South Canal and minor local creeks, the only significant body of water within the city is the  Lagoon Valley Lake.

The unincorporated communities of Allendale and Elmira are generally considered to be part of "greater" Vacaville.

Climate
Vacaville has a typical Mediterranean climate (Köppen Csa) with hot, dry summers and cool, wet winters. Characteristic of inland California, summers can get quite hot. Autumns are warm in the early part, but quickly cool down as the wet season approaches. Winters can be cool, and often foggy, but are mild compared to other regions. Spring is a rather pleasant season with fairly mild temperatures and not so much rain. The greater majority of precipitation falls in the autumn, winter, and spring, little to none in summer.

An average of 57 days have measurable precipitation.

Demographics

2020 

According to the 2020 United States Census, Vacaville had a population of 102,386. During the period 2015-2019, on average, 2.81 people lived in a household. The American Community Survey estimated the population identified as 50.5% non-Hispanic White, 24.8% Hispanic or Latino, 10.1% Black or African-American, 8.1% of two or more races, 7.8% Asian, 0.9% native Hawaiian or other Pacific Islander, and 0.7% American Indian or Alaska Native. The same survey estimated that 22.7% of the population was under 18 and 14% was over 65 years old.

2010
The 2010 United States Census reported that Vacaville had a population of 92,428. The racial makeup of Vacaville was 66.3% White, 10.3% African American, 0.9% Native American, 6.1% Asia]] (3.3% Filipino, 0.7% Chinese, 0.6% Indian, 0.5% Japanese, 0.3% Vietnamese, 0.3% Korean), 0.6% Pacific Islander, 8.8% from other races, and 7.0%from two or more races. Hispanics or Latinos of any race were 22.9% of the population (17.0% of Mexican, 0.9% Puerto Rican, 0.5% Salvadoran, 0.3% Nicaraguan, 0.2% Guatemalan, and 0.2% Peruvian descent).

The census reported that 91.3% of the population lived in households and 8.6% were institutionalized.

Of the 31,092 households, 37.8% had children under 18 living in them, 52.6% were opposite-sex married couples living together, 13.1% had a female householder with no husband present, 5.4% had a male householder with no wife present, 6.1% were unmarried opposite-sex partnerships, and 0.7% were same-sex married couples or partnerships; 7,053 households (22.7%) were made up of individuals, and 2,689 (8.6%) had someone living alone who was 65 or older. The average household size was 2.71.  The city had 22,101 families (71.1% of all households); the average family size was 3.19.

The age distribution was23.3%) under 18, 9.7% from 18 to 24, 28.4% from 25 to 44, 28.1% from 45 to 64, and 10.5% who were 65 or older.  The median age was 37.2 years. For every 100 females, there were 112.5 males.  For every 100 females 18 and over, there were 115.1 males.

The homeowner vacancy rate was 2.1%; the rental vacancy rate was 6.8%. About 59.0% of the population lived in owner-occupied housing units and 32.3% lived in rental housing units.

2000
As of the 2000 census 88,625 people were living in the city. The population density was 1,263.6/km2 (3,272.3/mi2). The 28,696 housing units had an average density of 409.1/km2 (1,059.5/mi2). The racial makeup of the city was 72.11% White, 10.02% African American, 0.97% Native American, 4.18% Asian, 0.45% Pacific Islander, 6.74% from other races, and 5.53% from two or more races. About 17.9% of the population were Hispanics or |Latinos of any race.

Of the 28,105 households, 20,966 were families, 41.4% had children under 18 living with them, 57.0% were married couples living together, 12.4% had a female householder with no husband present, and 25.4% were not families.About 19.2% of all households were made up of individuals, and 6.4% had someone living alone who was 65 or older. The average household size was 2.83, and the average family size was 3.24.

The median age was 34 years, and the age distribution of the population was 27.0% under 18, 9.0% from 18 to 24, 35.4% from 25 to 44, 20.3% from 45 to 64, and 8.3% who were 65 or older. For every 100 females, there were 118.4 males. For every 100 females 18 and over, there were 124.7 males.

Government

Vacaville is governed by a seven member City Council with six elected by district, and one mayor elected at large. Each serving four year terms. Current alignment is Presidential Election: District 1, 3, 5. Gubernatorial Election: Mayor and District 2, 4, 6.

Government effective as of January 2023:

Mayor - John Carli (elected 2022)
District 1 - Roy Stockton (elected 2020)
District 2 - Gregory Ritchie II (elected 2021, special)
District 3 - Michael Silva (elected 2020)
District 4 - Sarah Chapman (elected 2022)
District 5 - Jason Roberts (elected 2020)
District 6 - Jeanette Wylie (elected 2020, special/partial)

Vacaville is represented by California Assembly District 11 - Lori Wilson (California politician), California State Senate District 3 - Bill Dodd (California politician), and primarily by Congressional District 4 - Mike Thompson (California politician), however, a small portion in the east and southeast portion of the city is represented by Congressional District 8 - John Garamendi.

As of September 2022, there were 58,240 registered voters in Vacaville; of these, 22,198 (38.1%) are Democrats, 17,873 (30.7%) are Republicans, and 12,959 (22.3%) stated no party preference.

Economy

Personal income
According to the city of Vacaville, in 2019/2020, median household income was $82,513, which was 39% above the national average and 19% higher than the state average.

In 2007, the median income for a family was $63,950. Also in 2007, males had a median income of $43,527 versus $31,748 for females and per capita income for the city was $21,557. About 6.1% of the population and 4.3% of families lived below the poverty line. Of the total population, 7.4% of those under 18 and 4.8% of those 65 and older lived below the poverty line.

Industry
Biotechnology/pharmaceutical facilities are operated by Genentech, ALZA Corporation, Kaiser Permanente, and Novartis International AG. On May 14, 2014, ICON Aircraft announced they would consolidate all company functions in a new 140,000-square-foot facility in Vacaville. Two state prisons are located in Vacaville: California State Prison, Solano and California Medical Facility. The latter houses inmates undergoing medical treatments.

Top employers

According to the city's 2021 Comprehensive Annual Financial Report, the top employers in Vacaville (excluding government agencies) are:

Public agencies also constitute major employers; however, the city does not include them in its financial reports because they do not collect employee information through the business license renewal process. Major public employers in Vacaville include the California State Department of Corrections, Vacaville Unified School District, the State Compensation Insurance Fund, and the City of Vacaville.

Arts and culture 

Between 1992 and 1995, local artist Guillermo Wagner Granizo installed 20 outdoor ceramic-tile murals, set into three freestanding walls near City Hall, entitled, "Vacaville Centennial". The murals depict various aspects of the history of the city of Vacaville, including the early pioneers Juan Manuel Vaca, Juan Felipe Peña, and William McDaniel, the early fruit industry, the first schools, Peña Adobe Park, the Nut Tree (a 1920s roadside fruit and nut stand), various parades, the annual tree lighting ceremony, "Hamburger Hill", and the factory outlet stores, among others.

The city includes several historic buildings and places, including Peña Adobe, Will H. Buck House, Pleasants Ranch, and Vacaville Town Hall.

The Vacaville Cultural Center, located at the southeast corner of Allison Drive and Ulatis Drive, houses a regional library, the Vacaville Performing Arts Theatre, an outdoor garden, and rentable event space.

The city's libraries are operated by Solano County Library. The Vacaville Town Square Library is located within downtown, north of Main Street and east of Dobbins Road. The Vacaville Cultural Center Library is located within the Cultural Center facility at the southeast corner of Allison Drive and Ulatis Drive.

The Vacaville Art Gallery, located north of Andrews Park along East Monte Vista Avenue, provides exhibitions for local artists and community members.

Tourism

The city holds an annual Vacaville Fiesta Days celebration downtown, including a parade that features the public-school marching bands, gymnasts, and an electric car showcase, among other things.  Other sites for tourists include the Vacaville Premium Outlets and the Nut Tree, which is home to a train for children, a carousel, and a life-size chessboard, as well as numerous stores and dining establishments. Every Friday during the summer, the city holds the CreekWalk Concert Series in downtown Vacaville. Every December, the city holds a Festival of Trees in the ice skating rink and the Tree Lighting Ceremony, in which residents gather downtown to see a  tree illuminate and enjoy festive music played by the Jepson Band, hot chocolate, and horse-drawn carriage rides. The Jimmy Doolittle Center at the Nut Tree Airport displays aircraft from as early as 1912 and is home to the Jimmy Doolittle Shell Lockheed Vega. Displays also include personal items of General Doolittle and items related to the Doolittle Raid of 1942.

Recreation

Regional and community parks

Centennial Park 
Centennial Park is a 265-acre community park located at the intersection of Allison Drive and Browns Valley Parkway in northern Vacaville. Currently, the park includes four baseball fields; four tennis courts; five soccer fields used by the Vacaville United Soccer Club (VUSC); trails for walking, running, hiking, and biking; and off-leash areas for dogs. The city, in collaboration with the Solano Resource Conservation District, also provides an interpretive walk in both English and Spanish within the park. The Centennial Park Interpretive Walk is divided into ten panels: wetlands and beavers; park history; reptiles and amphibians; native shrubs; riparian corridors and riparian trees; bird boxes; naturally-occuring wildflowers; off-leash dogs; birds; and native understory plants.

The southern portion of the park formerly served as the city's dump, sewer treatment plant, and evaporation ponds throughout the 1900s. The northern portion of the park was used for farming. In 1980, the Vacaville Redevelopment Agency purchased the northern portion of the park for additional parkland. Due to the area's historical land uses, much of the park was in need of restoration to support vegetation and recreation. Amenities, including ballfields, tennis courts, soccer fields, and trails, were added at the southern portion of the park in the late 1990s. With the help of CalFire grants and the Solano Resource Conservation District, riparian and wetland vegetation has been restored in parts of the park.

The city is currently working on the Centennial Park Master Plan to plan for the future of the park. The draft master plan envisions three activity zones: (1) the active recreation zone; (2) the creekside discovery zone; and (3) the nature exploration zone. Future amenities in the park could include a new community recreation center, a playground, an event pavillion, community orchards, pickleball courts, basketball courts, a splash pad, a skate park, an RC car track, a bike skills course, picnic areas, and expanded trails.

Graham Aquatic Center 
The Graham Aquatic Center, located at the Three Oaks Community Center along Alamo Drive, is a community aquatics facility. The facility houses two waterslides, diving boards, lap lanes, barbecue areas, a playground, and a children's activity area.

Lagoon Valley Park 
Lagoon Valley Park is a 306-acre regional park located in southwestern Vacaville within Lagoon Valley. The park is centered around a 100-acre lagoon, which can be used for non-motorized boating. Amenities within the park include a 27-hole disc golf course; trails for walking, hiking, and biking; an outdoor archery range; an electric model flying field; a 30,000 square foot dog park; horseshoe pits; and picnic tables. Restroom facilities are available.

The park also houses the Peña Adobe Historical Area, which includes the historic Peña Adobe home and the Mowers-Goheen Museum.

Neighborhood parks 
The city also has a number of neighborhood parks, as listed below:

 Al Patch Park
 Alamo Creek Park
 Andrews Park
 Arbor Oaks Park
 Arlington Park
 Beelard Park
 Browns Valley Park
 Cambridge Park
 Canon Station Park
 City Hall Park
 Cooper School Park
 Corderos Park
 Creekside Park
 Dreamers Park
 Hawkins Park
 Keating Park
 Larsen Park
 Little Oak Park
 Magnolia Park
 Meadowlands Park
 Nashe Mesto Park
 Nelson Park
 Normandy Meadows
 North Orchard Park
 Padan Park
 Patwin Park
 Pheasant Country Park
 Play-4-All Park
 Ridgeview Park
 Southwood Park
 Stonegate Park
 Trower Park
 Willows Park

Future parks 
The city has a number of new public parks planned as the result of approving new development proposals. These include:

 Greentree Specific Plan - Greentree north neighborhood park
 Greentree Specific Plan - Greentree south neighborhood park
 Lower Lagoon Valley Policy Plan - Community park
 North Village Specific Plan - Area Plan 2 neighborhood park
 Roberts' Ranch Specific Plan - Eastern open space park
 The Farm at Alamo Creek Specific Plan - Community park
 Vanden Meadows Specific Plan - Neighborhood park

Trails 
Trails in Vacaville include:

 Alamo Creek Trail
 Southside Bikeway
 Ulatis Creek Trail

Education

Vacaville is served by two public school districts: Vacaville Unified School District and Travis Unified School District. The city is also served by a community college district, private schools and colleges.

Vacaville Unified School District
The Vacaville Unified School District (VUSD) includes the following campuses:

High schools 
 Buckingham Collegiate Charter Academy
 Ernest Kimme Academy for Independent Learners (K–12)
 Ernest Kimme Work Readiness and Alternative Pathway (Grades 7-12)
 Vacaville High School
 Will C. Wood High School

Middle schools 
 Ernest Kimme Academy for Independent Learners (K-12)
 Kairos Public Schools Vacaville Academy (Charter School)
 Sierra Vista K-8
 Vaca Peña Middle School
 Willis Jepson Middle School

Elementary schools
 Ace Program
 Alamo Elementary School
 Browns Valley Elementary School
 Cooper Elementary School
 Edwin Markham Elementary School
 Ernest Kimme Academy for Independent Learners (K-12)
 Eugene Padan Elementary School
 Fairmont Charter Elementary School
 Hemlock Elementary School
 Jean Callison Elementary
 Kairos Public Schools Vacaville Academy (K-8)
 Orchard Elementary
 Sierra Vista K-8

Preschool 

 Shelley Dally Early Learning Village

Alternate schools and programs 

 Ernest Kimme Charter Academy for Independent Learning
 Muzetta Thrower Adult Education Center

Travis Unified School District
The Travis Unified School District (TUSD), which serves Travis Air Force Base (TAFB) and parts of Fairfield and Vacaville, includes the following campuses:
 Cambridge Elementary School
 Foxboro Elementary School
 Center Elementary School (Fairfield)
 Scandia Elementary School (TAFB)
 Travis Elementary School (TAFB)

Its campuses serving Vacaville secondary students are:
 Golden West Middle School (Fairfield)
 Vanden High School (Fairfield)

Private schools
Private institutions with campuses in Vacaville are:
 Bethany Lutheran Preschool and Elementary School
 Centurion Christian Classical School
 Notre Dame Parochial School (Catholic Private School K-8)
 Vacaville Adventist (Seventh-day Adventist)
 Vacaville Christian Schools (preschool through 12th grade)
The Academy of 21st Century Learning

Colleges and universities
Vacaville is within the Solano Community College District. The Vacaville campus, located along North Village Parkway, features a 70-seat lecture hall, classrooms, science and computer laboratories, and a multipurpose room for theater arts and physical education. As part of the College's Bachelor's of Biomanufacturing degree program, the campus also contains the Biotechnology and Science Building, which houses four biotech labs, two chemistry labs, two biology labs, and a wet and dry anatomy lab. Among others, it offers an associate degree in biotechnology, which could lead to employment with local industries.

Other colleges and universities nearby include:
 California Maritime Academy (CSU)
 UC Berkeley
 UC Davis
 Sacramento State
 CSU East Bay
 Sonoma State
 St. Mary's College
 Touro University California
 InterCoast College (Fairfield campus)
 UMASS Global (Fairfield campus)
 Embry Riddle Aeronautical University (at Travis AFB)

Media 
Radio station KUIC is based in Vacaville.

The Vacaville Reporter is a local daily newspaper. The Daily Republic, based in Fairfield, also provides local news coverage on Vacaville.

Transportation 
Interstate 80 passes through Vacaville, connecting San Francisco to the southwest and Sacramento to the northeast. Interstate 505 branches off Interstate 80, connecting Vacaville to Winters before eventually reaching Interstate 5 to the north.

The Fairfield-Vacaville Hannigan railroad station, located east of Peabody Road in neighboring Fairfield, serves Vacaville and Fairfield. The station opened in November 2017. The station is served by Capitol Corridor trains operated by Amtrak California.

TheVacaville Transportation Center, located along Allison Drive and adjacent to Interstate 80, is the main hub for commuters via bus as well as vanpools and park-and-ride to the Sacramento area and the San Francisco Bay Area. Vacaville City Coach provides local bus service. SolanoExpress, which is operated by SolTrans, provides intercity connections to Fairfield, Benicia, Davis, Walnut Creek BART, and Sacramento.

The Nut Tree Airport is located in Vacaville and is operated by the Solano County General Services Department.

Infrastructure
The city includes two hospitals, NorthBay VacaValley Hospital, a 50-bed facility whose campus also includes the NorthBay Cancer Center and HealthSpring Fitness Center, and the Kaiser Permanente Vacaville Medical Center, a hospital and trauma center.

Notable people
(B) denotes that the person was born in Vacaville.
 Arthur Adams (born 1963), comic-book artist known for  Longshot and Monkeyman and O'Brien
 Brothers Wayne and Trent Gardner - founders and members of American prog metal band Magellan
 Dennis Alexio (born 1959) – kickboxer, eight-time world champion (B)
 Chris Begley – member of the band Fight Fair
 Andy Bloom (born 1973) - Olympic shot putter, NCAA champion in shot put and discus
 Frank H. Buck - politician, fruit baron, developer of Beverly Hills, California  (B)
 Jarrett Bush – NFL player, Green Bay Packers, Will C. Wood High School alumnus (B)
 Kyle DeVan – offensive guard for Indianapolis Colts
 Jermaine Dye – Major League Baseball player; 2005 World Series MVP with the Chicago White Sox (B)
 Tony Gonsolin - Pitcher for the Los Angeles Dodgers  (B)
 Xzavie Jackson – defensive end for Cincinnati Bengals
 Stefan Janoski - skateboarder
 Willis Linn Jepson - botanist and conservationist  (B)
 Josh Kaddu - linebacker for the Miami Dolphins
 Bonnie McKee - pop singer and songwriter (B)
 Tawny Newsome - actress, comedienne, and musician; voices Beckett Mariner on Star Trek: Lower Decks (B)
 Vince Newsome - NFL player for Los Angeles Rams, Cleveland Browns, Baltimore Ravens; in 1983, became first Vacaville resident drafted into NFL
 Frank Parker - actor, played Grandpa Shawn Brady on Days of Our Lives
 Papa Roach – rock band
Aaron Pauley - bassist and vocalist of rock band Of Mice & Men
 Michael Polenske - vintner
 A. Purves Pullen (a.k.a. Dr. Birdbath) – voice actor known for mimicking birds and animals, including bird sounds in the Disney film Snow White and the Seven Dwarfs
 Jacoby Shaddix – lead singer of rock band Papa Roach
 Casey Sheehan – awarded Bronze Star with Palm Fronds posthumously for actions in Iraq on April 4, 2004
 Cindy Sheehan – political activist
 Jessica Sierra - singer
 Robyn Stevens (born 1983) - race walker
 Carson Strong - football quarterback for the Philadelphia Eagles  (B)
 Greg Tagert - baseball manager
 Mykal Walker - NFL linebacker for the Atlanta Falcons
 Thomas Williams – linebacker for USC Trojans and NFL
 Luzena Wilson - California Gold Rush entrepreneur and memoirist

See also

1892 Vacaville–Winters earthquakes
Nut Tree Airport
Rancho Los Putos

References

External links

 
 Vacaville Visitor's Bureau

 
1892 establishments in California
Incorporated cities and towns in California
Cities in Solano County, California
Cities in the San Francisco Bay Area
Populated places established in 1892